Arizona is a landlocked state situated in the southwestern region of the United States of America. It has a vast and diverse geography famous for its deep canyons, high- and low-elevation deserts, numerous natural rock formations, and volcanic mountain ranges. Arizona shares land borders with Utah to the north, the Mexican state of Sonora to the south, New Mexico to the east, and Nevada to the northwest, as well as water borders with California and the Mexican state of Baja California to the southwest along the Colorado River. Arizona is also one of the Four Corners states and is diagonally adjacent to Colorado.

Of this area, just 0.3% consists of water, which makes Arizona the state with the second lowest percentage of water area (New Mexico is the lowest at 0.2%).

Political geography

Arizona is divided into 15 counties, and has 90 incorporated cities and towns. Approximately 65 percent of Arizona residents live in Maricopa County, which had a population of 3,817,117 as of the 2010 Census. Maricopa County ranks fourth among the nation's counties in terms of population, and is more populated than 24 of the U.S. states. The county seat of Maricopa County is Phoenix, which is Arizona's largest city and capital.

The next most populous county is Pima County, which had a 2010 census population of 980,263. The county seat of Pima County is Tucson, where nearly all of the population is concentrated. Combined, nearly 80% of Arizona residents live in either Maricopa County or Pima County, even though the two counties make up 16% of Arizona's total area. Because of the high population of Maricopa County and Pima County, both counties are dominant in state politics.

About 15% of Arizona is privately owned, the remaining land consisting primarily of public forest and park land, Native American reservations, military institutions, and swaths of wilderness held by the Bureau of Land Management. Arizona is home to 21 federally recognized tribes, which are each semi-autonomous. The large majority are part of the Navajo Nation, which is the largest Native American reservation in terms of population and size. The Navajo Reservation covers all of northeastern Arizona along with portions of New Mexico and Utah, and had a population of 107,449 as of the 2010 census.

Climate

Due to the state's large area and range of elevation, there is a variety of localized climate conditions. Overall, most of Arizona receives little precipitation, and is classified as having either an arid or semi-arid climate. The northern parts of the state and the mountainous areas tend to have cooler climates, while the southwestern parts of the state tend to be warm year round.

Rainfall

Precipitation in Arizona is governed by elevation and the season of year. The peak periods of rainfall are during the early winter, when storm systems from the Pacific Ocean cross the state, and during the summer, when moisture-bearing winds sweep into Arizona from the southeast, which obtain moisture from the Gulf of Mexico. Summer rains tend to occur in the form of thunderstorms, which result from excessive heating of the ground and the lifting of moisture-laden air along mountain ranges. These thunderstorms can cause strong winds, brief periods of blowing dust, and infrequently cause hail. The heaviest precipitation is found in the mountain ranges of central and southeastern Arizona, while the driest conditions are found in the arid regions of southwestern Arizona.

The number of days with measurable precipitation can vary from around 70 in the Flagstaff area to 15 in the Yuma area. Annual average humidity values vary from 55% in Flagstaff to 23% in Yuma. Due to the high temperatures, low humidity, and occurrence of sunshine, Arizona has high rates of evaporation. During El Niño, the Pacific jet stream enters the U.S. further south of its normal position, making Arizona winters wetter than usual. The opposite phase, La Niña, reinforces the jet streams northern route, making Arizona winters even drier than normal.

Snow

While the desert parts of Arizona are renowned for their warm climates, snow is not uncommon to portions of Arizona. From November through March, when storm systems from the Pacific Ocean cross the state, heavy snow can accumulate in the mountains of central, northern, and southeastern Arizona. Moderate snow can occur as far south as Nogales, Arizona, which is located on the southern border with Mexico, since it experiences below-freezing nighttime temperatures during the winter.

The rims of the Grand Canyon experience snow during the winter due to their high altitudes. The South Rim of the Grand Canyon, located at an altitude averaging , receives  of snow annually, and the North Rim of the Grand Canyon, located at an altitude over  receives  of snow.

Temperature

Because of the dry climate and sparse cloud cover throughout the state, temperatures can vary dramatically, from day to night, and from season to season. Parts of Arizona located in the Sonoran Desert have warm daytime temperatures year round, while other parts of the state experience seasonal coldness regularly. The record high temperature for Arizona was 128 °F (53 °C), measured in Lake Havasu City on June 29, 1994, and July 5, 2007. The record low temperature for Arizona was -40 °F (-40 °C), measured at Hawley Lake on January 7, 1971.

Full statistics for ThreadEx cities

Physiographic regions

Arizona can be divided into two major physiographic regions: the Colorado Plateau and the Basin and Range Province, and a transitioning zone between the two called the Transition Zone.

Colorado Plateau

The Colorado Plateau is a semi-arid, mostly flat-lying region ranging from 5,000 to 8,000 feet (1524 m to 2438 m) in elevation, centered on the Four Corners region. It consists of northern Arizona, except for a small portion of northwestern Arizona. The Plateau ends with the steep rock wall of the Mogollon Rim, which defines the southern edge of the plateau.

The Colorado Plateau has the nickname "Red Rock Country" because of its brightly colored sedimentary rock left visible by dryness and erosion, and protected from deformation. The geology of the Colorado Plateau is exhibited by the canyons of the Colorado River, and the Grand Canyon exposes one of the most unusual rock sequences in the world. The area hosts many distinctive natural features unique to Arizona, including the Grand Canyon, Antelope Canyon, Meteor Crater, Painted Desert, and the Petrified Forest.

Transition Zone

The Transition Zone is a northwest-trending escarpment of mountainous terrain in central Arizona shaped by the intersection of the higher-level Colorado Plateau with the lower-level Basin and Range Province. The area is termed the Transition Zone because it is transitional between the two regions, with characteristics from both. The area consists of a series of rugged mountain ranges and valleys. Many of the mountains of the Transition Zone are part of the Mogollon Rim, a cliff, or a dramatic escarpment in places, which extends  from northern Yavapai County eastward to near the border with New Mexico.

The mountain ranges of the Transition Zone include the Mazatzal, Santa Maria, Sierra Ancha, and White mountain ranges. Because of the range of elevation within the Transition Zone, climatic conditions can vary widely over small areas. The Transition Zone tends to be one of the areas of Arizona to receive heavier rainfall due to its mountainous terrain, and experiences a variation in temperature by altitude.

Basin and Range Province

The Basin and Range Province is a region occupying the southern part of Arizona, along with a strip of land consisting of the western part of the state. It is also part of a much larger region encompassing southwestern New Mexico, western Utah, and virtually all of Nevada, and extending into northwestern Mexico. The Basin and Range is characterized by steep, linear mountain ranges alternating with lengthy deserts. The mountain ranges, which poke through the lengthy desert plains surrounding them, can rise above , and create biological islands inhabited by cool-climate plants and animals. The geology of the Basin and Range is the result of crustal extension of the North American plate. Due to the crustal extension, the area of the crust underneath the region is some of the thinnest in the world. The Basin and Range supplies nearly all of the copper mined in Arizona, and contains other minerals such as gold, silver, and barite.

Rivers

The major rivers of Arizona are the Colorado River, and one of its main tributaries, the Gila River. Nearly all of Arizona is drained by either the Colorado River or one of its tributaries.

Colorado River

The Colorado River is vital to Arizona because of the perennial dryness of the region. The river is famous because of its role in the creation of the Grand Canyon, which was created over a period of six million years. Several irrigation systems divert water from the Colorado River, of which the one most vital to Arizona is the Central Arizona Project. The Central Arizona Project, which is 336 miles (541 km) long, diverts  of water from Lake Havasu City into central and southern Arizona. The river is also utilized for hydroelectric power through various dams along the river. The dams on the Colorado River, going downstream, are the Glen Canyon Dam, Hoover Dam, Davis Dam, Parker Dam, Imperial Dam, Laguna Dam, and the Morelos Dam.

Gila River

While the upper Gila River is free-flowing, the portion of the river below the Phoenix area is usually either a trickle or completely dry because of the diversion of water for irrigation.

Deserts

Sonoran Desert

The Sonoran Desert covers the southwestern area of Arizona, including the cities of Phoenix, Tucson, and Yuma. The Sonoran Desert is one of the hottest deserts of the United States, and maintains warm temperatures year round. Despite the sparse amounts of precipitation during the year, the desert is home to a diverse population of flora and fauna because it has two rainy seasons a year. Several plant populations thrive because of their specialized adaptions to the climate, and various species of cactus can be found in the wild. The Sonoran Desert is the only place in the world where the saguaro cactus grows in the wild, and the fishhook, prickly pear, and organ pipe are among other types of cactus found in the Sonoran Desert.

Mojave Desert

Northwestern Arizona contains part of the Mojave Desert, which is at a higher altitude than the Sonoran Desert. The boundaries of the Mojave Desert can be determined by the presence of Yucca brevifolia (Yucca palm), which is endemic to the desert. Unlike the Sonoran Desert, the Mojave Desert has few trees, both in number and diversity.

Painted Desert

The Painted Desert is a broad area of badlands located on the Colorado Plateau in Northern Arizona. The Painted Desert derives its name from the multitude of colored sediments and bentonite clay seen from its Chinle rock formation, left exposed by erosion. In the southern portion of the desert, the remains of a Triassic period coniferous forest have fossilized over millions of years. Most of the Painted Desert is located within the Navajo Nation, and is only accessible by foot.

Chihuahuan Desert

A small portion of southeastern Arizona is part of the Chihuahuan Desert. Because of its higher elevation in comparison to the Sonoran Desert, it tends to have milder temperatures during the summer.

Islands

Arizona is the third largest state to not have an ocean coastline—after Montana and New Mexico.  Despite being landlocked, Arizona does contain islands, even though the state has the third lowest amount of water at only 363.73 mi² (942 km²) after West Virginia and New Mexico.  Arizona's 0.3% of water is the second lowest percentage after New Mexico's 0.2% of water.  The majority of Arizona's islands are in the Colorado River (mainly Lake Mead). Lake Roosevelt also contains a number of islands.

Mountains

Arizona is a fairly mountainous and rugged state, and is home to the world's largest contiguous ponderosa pine forest. Many mountain ranges exceed  in elevation, and some can hold snow all summer.

Arizona has 194 named mountain ranges. The highest are along the southwest margin of the Colorado Plateau, including the volcanic San Francisco Peaks just north of Flagstaff and the White Mountains of the Mogollon Rim. The Basin and Range region of southern and western Arizona has many rugged ranges existing as sky islands in the Sonoran and Chihuahuan deserts.

Ten highest mountain peaks

Humphreys Peak

Humphreys Peak in the Coconino National Forest is the highest summit in Arizona. The mountain is high enough to maintain snow cover in summer, when temperatures may not exceed 40 °F. The only maintained trail to the summit is the Humphreys Trail, a strenuous hike that starts at Arizona Snowbowl. Towards the top of the trail Humphreys Peak contains the only area of subarctic tundra south of the Rocky Mountains.

Agassiz Peak

Simply referred to as "Agassiz", Agassiz Peak is Mount Humphreys' sister peak and one of the San Francisco Mountains' "Big 4", or the top five highest peaks in Arizona. The mountain is closed to climbers in the summer to protect its fragile tundra environment. This peak loses its snow usually in late May but has been known to keep snow until June.

Fremont Peak

This summit is relatively unknown to visitors and locals, and it is located along the Doyle Saddle, where it is not very prominent. It really isn't a summit, just a high point on the Doyle Saddle. The Humphreys Trail runs on this ridge and atop Fremont Peak.

Aubineau Peak

This is a fairly steep peak, and the home of the 2005 avalanche. This mountain is on the north side of the San Francisco Mountains and is adjacent to Abineau Canyon.

Ree's Peak

This peak lacks alpine tundra but is home to the famed bristlecone pine. The peak is distinguishable only by looking directly at it, otherwise the other summits completely flush it out.

Doyle Peak

The peak can be best viewed from Shultz Pass road, and is known for its continuous aspen belt. This peak is the starting point of the Doyle Saddle, connecting Doyle Peak with Agassiz Peak.

Mount Baldy

Its name was given to it by locals because it lacks trees on the upper ridge, giving it a baldlike appearance. Mount Baldy is home to the Sunrise Ski Area. The mountain is not part of a range, just a single prominent peak whose flanks are gentle and peak is rounded, not rugged. This is the same for most of the White Mountains, a geologically old range once as high as the Alaska Range, but that has been eroded away over the eons. Mount Baldy is home to a bristlecone pine forest, and some consider the White Mountains as a Rocky Mountains extension due to similar averages in elevation, tree species, animals, and weather.

Mount Ord

At , Mount Ord is part of the White Mountains, and is located in Apache County on the Fort Apache Indian Reservation.

Paradise Butte

At , Paradise Butte is found in the White Mountains near Mount Baldy and Mount Ord, near Sunrise Ski Park.

Mount Thomas

See also
 List of regions of Arizona
 List of volcanic craters in Arizona

Notes

References

External links

 Arizona Geographic Information Council 
 University of Texas Maps of Arizona
 Arizona Electronic Atlas Maps of Arizona
 Mountain Zone